Pendarini is a tribe of leafhoppers in the family Cicadellidae. There are eight genera and around 250 described species in Pendarini.

Genera
These eight genera belong to the tribe Pendarini:

References

Further reading

External links

 

 
Deltocephalinae
Hemiptera tribes